The Highlander (also known as the Highlander Shorthair, and originally as the Highland Lynx) is a new breed of cat. The unique appearance of the Highlander comes from the deliberate cross between the Desert Lynx and the Jungle Curl breeds, also recently developed.

Description
The Highlander originated as a crossbreed of the experimental Desert Lynx breed and the Jungle Curl, to add the latter's curled ears to the former. They are bobtailed or short-tailed, have spotted or classic bullseye markings, mackerel and resemble the bobcat. The Highlander has a long sloping forehead and blunt muzzle with a very wide nose. The eyes are wide-set and the ears are upright with a slight curl and a slight turn in the backward direction. Some have polydactyl paws but this is not a desired trait in the cats and have been proved to cause health problems in the knees and hips as the cats age. Highlanders have no known health problems, and are fond of water. The body is substantial and very muscular. Despite the "big-cat look", the Highlander is a human-oriented, friendly and playful cat, and very active and confident. The Highlander displays tabby/lynx point or solid point coloration in various colors. Bicolored cats are not allowed in the breed standard. Although some cats are polydactyl, it is not part of the standard and it is a disqualification in the show ring.

History
The Highlander breed refinement began in 2004, to distinguish the breed better from its foundation stock, and to seek competition status in major breed registries. The name Highlander was adopted in late 2005. Starting May 1, 2008, the breed was recognized by The International Cat Association (TICA) for competition in the Preliminary New Breed class, and in 2016 was moved up to Advanced New Breed. TICA divides Highlanders into two varieties, under the names Highlander Shorthair (HGS) and simply Highlander (HG) for the longer-haired variation.

References

Cat breeds
Cat breeds and types with bent ears
Cat breeds originating in the United States
Cat breeds and types with suppressed tails
Experimental cat breeds